Augustus Neville was a New Zealand-born actor who appeared in a number of the early films for director Raymond Longford but was best known for his stage career in Australia, particularly in works by William Shakespeare. He worked for many years with Alfred Dampier and Allan Wilkie.

Selected Credits
For the Term of His Natural Life (1908)
Captain Starlight, or Gentleman of the Road (1911)
The Romantic Story of Margaret Catchpole (1911)
Sweet Nell of Old Drury (1911)
The Tide of Death (1912)
The Midnight Wedding (1912)
The Murder of Captain Fryatt (1917)
The Pioneers (1926)

References

External links

Australian stage credits at AusStage
Augustus Neville at National Film and Sound Archive

20th-century Australian male actors
Year of death missing
Year of birth missing
New Zealand expatriates in Australia
Australian male silent film actors
Australian male stage actors